The Southern Korea evergreen forests is a temperate broadleaf and mixed forests ecoregion at the southern end of the Korean Peninsula.

Geography
The ecoregion also includes Ulleungdo Island, which lies 135 km east of the peninsula in the Sea of Japan.

Climate
The climate is humid and temperate. Rainfall averages 1000 mm per year, with two-thirds falling between June and September. Winters are drier and mild, with a mean January temperate of 2 °C. There are occasional winter snowfalls, but snow rarely accumulates.

Flora
The natural vegetation is evergreen broadleaf laurel forest, with members of the oak family (Castanopsis cuspidata, Quercus acuta, and Quercus myrsinifolia) and laurel family (Persea thunbergii, Cinnamomum camphora, and others) prominent. Other trees and shrubs include Carpinus laxiflora, Elaeocarpus, Neolitsea, Daphniphyllum macropodum, Ilex integra, Hedera, Eurya japonica, Pittosporum tobira, and Viburnum awabuki.

The Bijarim forest on Jeju is home to dense groves of Bija (Nutmeg or Nutmeg yew, Torreya nucifera). The ivy shrub Fatsia japonica is another Jeju native.

Fauna
South Korea has 379 species of birds, including 111 are winter visitors and 90 are winter and spring passage migrants. Most of these species either reside or visit the southern evergreen forests, where the winter climate is milder. 207 bird species and subspecies have been recorded on the Jeju, and 54 species on the Ulleungdo Island. Resident birds of the ecoregion include white-bellied woodpecker (Dryocopus javensis), fairy pitta (Pitta nympha), and ring-necked pheasant (Phasianus colchicus torquatus). The red-crowned crane (Grus japonensis) breeds in freshwater marshes, and both the red-crowned crane and white-naped crane (Grus vipio) overwinter in coastal and freshwater wetlands and along rivers.

Mammals on Jeju include roe deer, weasels, hamsters, field mice, house rats and two species of bats. Wild boar and wild cats have been extirpated from the island.

Eight amphibian and reptile species have been recorded on Jeju. Ulleungdo has no native reptiles or amphibians.

Conservation
The forests are mostly gone, replaced by intensive agriculture. Enclaves exist in the Ulsan, Hampyeong, and Naejang-san national monuments, and on Jeju.

A 2017 assessment found that 630 km2, or 4%, of the ecoregion is in protected areas. 15% of the unprotected area is still forested.

The ecoregion is home to four national parks, Dadohaehaesang, Hallyeohaesang, and Wolchulsan on the mainland, and  Hallasan on Jeju.

External link

References

Ecoregions of Asia
Ecoregions of South Korea
Forests of South Korea
Palearctic ecoregions
Temperate broadleaf and mixed forests